Here are the channel frequency table analog television broadcast/received in the provinces, the territory in Vietnam, divided by regions across the country.
Currently, Analog TV nationwide has stopped broadcasting on 28 December 2020 due to government digitization roadmap.
Previously, analog television in Vietnam mostly broadcast on the VHF band (from channel 6 to channel 12), and the UHF band (from channel 21 to channel 62), only a few places broadcast less than 6 VHF, like 3 VHF in Tam Dao).

Northwest

Northeast

Red River Delta

North Central

South Central

Highland Central

Southeast

Southwest (Mekong River Delta)

Other 
Some places broadcast channels from 63 – 69UHF, mainly channels that are illegally broadcast via analog (such as in Ninh Binh, Binh Dinh, Gia Lai, Quang Nam....).  Some other smuggled channels also broadcast on frequency channels from 6 VHF – 62 UHF (such as in Ninh Binh, Ha Tay, Quang Nam, Quang Ngai...)
 Frequency channels from 13 VHF – 20 UHF are for military television programs of some provinces/city (such as Ninh Binh, Thai Binh....).

See also 
List of analog television stations in Vietnam
List of radio stations in Vietnam
List of digital television stations in Vietnam
List of television channels in Vietnam

Comment

References

Note 

Television in Vietnam